Baye McNeil is an African-American writer and speaker, who has been living in Japan since 2004.  He is a columnist for The Japan Times and frequent contributor to the Japanese language online publication Toyo Keizai. He has authored two self-published memoirs, Hi! My Name is Loco and I am a Racist (2012) and Loco in Yokohama (2013).

Early life 
According to his books and interviews, McNeil was born in Brooklyn, New York, where he was raised by a single mother. He went to a pan-Africanist school and has  membership in the Five-Percent Nation, a Black nationalist movement influenced by the organization, Nation of Islam. He once served in the U.S. Army and witnessed the events of 9/11. Baye McNeil moved to Japan in 2004. He worked as an English teacher at an eikaiwa for 3 years and then moved to Yokohama in 2008

Career 

McNeil since then has blogged extensively from his website bayemcneil.com on topics mainly about racial issues. He has a monthly column called "Black Eye" in The Japan Times since 2014 about issues of race and ethnicity from his viewpoint as an African American.McNeil's commentary has been sought out by some journalists. He has appeared in various media outlets, including BBC, TBS, The New York Times, The Japan Times, The Washington Post and Japan Up Close commenting on issues about race in Japan. 

In 2015, McNeil was involved in a successful campaign to remove a segment of a show planned to air on Fuji TV in Japan, in which Japanese bands were to perform in "blackface."  Later, in 2018, comedian Masatoshi Hamada appeared in blackface on Japanese television. McNeil's opposition to this was covered internationally by news outlets such as BBC, The New York Times, the New York Daily News, Vox and TBS. However, some Japanese people argued that "Blackface" was only considered offensive in America since they intentionally used it to mock black people back then while other countries don't have this historical context.

Controversy 
In 2020, Baye McNeil was upset about Japanese people for not supporting the BLM protests in Japan. Many locals view this movement is not related to themselves and also it would be dangerous to the public for holding huge protests in the middle of a global pandemic outbreak. However, McNeil was angered by the fact that Japanese people are unable to feel empathized. He wrote a blog post expressing his disappointment and called the Japanese who opposed the protests "castrated".  His remarks quickly sparked backlash on the Japanese internet as they thought Baye was just trying to bring his home issues to another country and enforce his value on other people. Famous Japanese artist Megumi Igarashi criticized him for trying to impose his own values on Japanese people without even understanding the Japanese culture and people. He later changed the word 'castrated' to 'spiritually neutered' in the English version without any explanation but still can be seen in the Japanese version.

Reception
Baye McNeil self-describes himself and his works as "The driving force of what was to become one of the most talked-about blogs around these parts, as well as one of the most respected books on expat life in Japan: “Hi My Name is Loco and I am a Racist."

He has received some criticism as some see him being too American-centric and too obsessed with race. Famous Japanese sculptor and manga artist Megumi Igarashi (ろくでなし子) openly criticized Baye McNeil for his tendency of imposing his own beliefs on Japanese people without even understanding much about Japanese society and culture.

Books 
 Hi! My Name is Loco and I am a Racist (Hunterfly Road Publishing, 2012) 
 Loco in Yokohama (Hunterfly Road Publishing, 2013)

References

External links
 
 
 Interview in The New York Times

American expatriates in Japan
African-American memoirists
21st-century American memoirists
21st-century American male writers
American columnists
Writers from Brooklyn
Year of birth missing (living people)
Living people
21st-century African-American people